José David Ramírez García  (born 14 December 1995), also known as El Avión, is a Mexican professional footballer who plays as a right-back for Liga MX club León.

Club career

Guadalajara
Ramírez made his professional debut on 20 February 2014 in the Copa MX against Estudiantes Tecos. He scored his first official league goal on 30 August 2015 at home against Chiapas.

International career

Youth
Ramírez won the CONCACAF U-20 Championship with Mexico in 2015. Ramírez participated in the 2015 FIFA U-20 World Cup in New Zealand.

Senior
On 27 October 2021, Ramírez made his senior national team debut under Gerardo Martino in a friendly match against Ecuador.

Career statistics

Club

International

Honours
Guadalajara
Copa MX: Apertura 2015

León
Liga MX: Guardianes 2020
Leagues Cup: 2021

Mexico U20
CONCACAF U-20 Championship: 2015

References

External links
 

1995 births
Living people
Footballers from Guanajuato
Sportspeople from León, Guanajuato
Association football midfielders
C.D. Guadalajara footballers
Liga MX players
Mexico under-20 international footballers
Mexico international footballers
2015 CONCACAF U-20 Championship players
Mexican footballers